Ten Alps Plc is a UK-based multimedia production company formed of three divisions. Television production falls under four brands: Blakeway, Brook Lapping, Films of Record and Reef TV. The first three produce documentaries and current affairs programmes for global broadcasters- including BBC's Panorama, and Channel  4's Dispatches - as well as popular factual series for outlets such as Channel 5.  Reef was acquired in July 2015. 

Ten Alps Communicate manages a digital cross-platform portfolio which includes major programmes such as Transport for London's Children's Traffic Club, and educational websites, apps and channels for Siemens, Nationwide, BMW, AstraZeneca, and other major organisations. 

Ten Alps Publishing is structured around specialised business-to-business audiences with a focus on finance, small businesses, health, pharmaceuticals, logistics and farming niches.

History
Ten Alps was founded in 1999 by Alex Connock, Bob Geldof and Des Shaw. For £1 they bought Planet 24 Radio, a subsidiary of Geldof’s previous TV production company Planet 24, producer of The Big Breakfast and The Word, when Planet 24 TV was sold to ITV subsidiary Carlton TV. The name Ten Alps derives from Planet, spelt backwards. The first production was award-winning current affairs radio programme Sunday Service for BBC Radio 5 Live. Ten Alps listed on the AIM in 2001.

References

External links 
 

Television production companies of the United Kingdom